The Interception of Communications Bill of 2006 is a Zimbabwean bill that proposes to allow government agencies to intercept telephonic, e-mail and cellphone messages. The Bill also requires that operators of telecommunications services install software and hardware to enable interception of communication and storing of  information specified by the government.

See also
 South Africa's Regulation of Interception of Communications and Provision of Communication-Related Information Act (RICA)

External links
 Zimbabwe moves to monitor private communications article by Commonwealth Press Union
 MISA-Zimbabwe analysis the constitutionality of the Interception of Communications Bill 2006 on Zimbabwe Situation

Privacy of telecommunications
Communications in Zimbabwe